Janine Winton Haines, AM (née Carter; 8 May 1945 – 20 November 2004) was an Australian politician who was a Senator for South Australia from 1977 to 1978 and again from 1981 to 1990. She represented the Australian Democrats, and served as the party's leader from 1986 to 1990, becoming the first female federal parliamentary leader of an Australian political party. She was pivotal in "shaping the Australian Democrats into a powerful political entity that held the balance of power in the Senate".

Life
Haines was born in Tanunda, South Australia, to a schoolteacher mother and policeman father, and travelled around South Australia with her parents and younger brother, due to her father's job. They eventually settled in Adelaide and she attended Brighton High School. She married Ian Haines, whom she met at University of Adelaide where they were both studying mathematics, in 1967. They had two daughters, Melanie and Bronwyn. She taught English part-time and commenced an MA thesis on the poet Shaw Neilson but this was interrupted when she suffered a severe whiplash injury in a car accident.

She died in 2004, at age 59, from a degenerative neurological condition, and was honoured with a state funeral in Adelaide.

Political career
Haines became the assistant of Robin Millhouse, an important player in the South Australian conservative party the Liberal and Country League. Millhouse founded the Liberal Movement and the short-lived New LM which merged into the Australian Democrats in 1977. She was appointed to fill a casual vacancy in the Senate by the Parliament of South Australia, on the nomination of Labor premier Don Dunstan, on 14 December 1977. As a result of the 1977 Referendum the appointment was required to be from the same party as the resigning Senator, "unless there is no member of that party available to be chosen or appointed". The casual vacancy arose following the resignation of  Steele Hall who had been elected as a representative of the former Liberal Movement. Controversially, Dunstan chose to nominate Haines, who had been third on the Liberal Movement ticket from which Hall had been elected in 1975. Haines was not a member of the Liberal Movement at the time of her appointment, with the party dissolving in 1976. A majority of Liberal Movement members, including Hall and second on the ticket, Michael Wilson, joined the Liberal Party, while Haines joined the Democrats.

Haines did not contest the 1977 Australian federal election, and her Senate term expired on 30 June 1978. She was elected for a six-year term at the 1980 Australian federal election.  On 14 August 1986, she was chosen by Democrats members as Senate leader on the retirement of inaugural leader Don Chipp.

She remained Senate leader until resigning to contest the House of Representatives seat of Kingston in the March 1990 election, believing the Democrats needed a "high profile lower house presence". She was unsuccessful in the face of a negative campaign waged against her by both major parties. She was succeeded as interim Senate leader for several months by deputy Dr Michael Macklin (Qld), pending the customary election of a new leader by party members, at which Janet Powell was successful.

Later career
After leaving parliament Haines worked in a number of public positions including being president of the Australia Privacy Charter Council and deputy chancellor of the University of Adelaide.

She was invested with membership of the Order of Australia (AM) on 11 June 2001.

She wrote a book Suffrage to Sufferance: One Hundred Years of Women in Politics (Allen and Unwin, North Sydney, 1992) which has been a prescribed text in universities and schools.

Notes

References
Murphy, Damien (2004) "A pivotal force to be reckoned with: Janine Haines, Politician, 1945–2004" (Obituary) in The Sydney Morning Herald, 2004-11-24, p. 36

External links
[http://www.smh.com.au/news/National/Janine-Haines-dies-aged-59/2004/11/21/1100972254636.html Obituary in Sydney Morning Herald, 21 November 2004]
Tribute to Janine Haines
First speech of Senator Meg Lees
Collection of parliamentary condolence speeches
Search Australian Honours

History Detective Podcast Ladies in the House: Janine Haines 

1945 births
2004 deaths
Australian Democrats members of the Parliament of Australia
Members of the Australian Senate
Members of the Australian Senate for South Australia
Members of the Order of Australia
People from Tanunda, South Australia
Women members of the Australian Senate
Leaders of the Australian Democrats
20th-century Australian politicians
20th-century Australian women politicians